Perdika Press is a British publishing house specialising in experimental English Poetry and work in translation by contemporary poets.  It has been the conduit for unique British publications of works from Bill Berkson and F.T. Prince, as well as important poetry from a variety of established and first-time authors having Modernist leanings.  The pair of posthumous pamphlets of previously unpublished poetry by F.T. Prince were released together in 2015.

Perdika Press was founded in 2006 by Peter Brennan, Mario Petrucci and Nicholas Potamitis in Enfield, North London. So far, publications comprise:

SERIES 1.
 Catullus (2006) by Mario Petrucci; 
 N. (2006) by Nicholas Potamitis; 
 Mallarme (2006) by Christine North; 
 Ganymede (2006) by Adam Simmonds; 
 Torch of Venus (2007) by Peter Brennan; 
 Akhmatova (2007) by Tom Jones; 

SERIES 2.
 somewhere is january (2007/8) by Mario Petrucci; 
 The First Dream (2008) by Michael Grant; 
 Didymoi (2008) by Peter Brennan; 
 Sappho (2008) by Mario Petrucci; 
 The Small Stones (2009) by Tomas Weber; 
 Laforgue (2009) by Christine North; 

SERIES 3.
 Apollinaire (2009) by Jacqui Rowe; 
 Pessoa (2009) by Simon Jenner; 
 Lady Air (2010) by Bill Berkson; 
 bedbound (2012) by David Pollard; 
 LONDON CITYSCAPE SIJO And Other Poems (2012) by Robert Vas Dias; 
 Sudden rainfall (2013) by Helen Calcutt; 

SERIES 4.
 1111 (2014) by Mario Petrucci; 
 Memoirs of Caravaggio (2015) by F.T. Prince; 
 In Keats Country (2015) by F.T. Prince;

External links
Perdika Press Official website

Book publishing companies of the United Kingdom
Poetry publishers